Muhuru Bay is a town in Nyanza Province of Kenya. It is situated on the banks of Lake Victoria, close to the border with Tanzania.

References 

Populated places in Nyanza Province